JS Suzutsuki (DD-117) is the third ship of Akizuki-class destroyers. She was commissioned on 12 March 2014.

Construction and career
Suzutsuki was laid down on May 18, 2011 at Mitsubishi Heavy Industries Nagasaki Shipyard & Machinery Works as the 2009 plan 5,000-ton type escort ship No. 2246 based on the medium-term defense capability development plan, and launched on October 17, 2012. Commissioned on March 12, 2014, was incorporated into the 8th Escort Corps of the 4th Escort Corps and deployed to Sasebo.

On July 10, 2016, as the 25th dispatched anti-piracy action surface corps, sailed from Sasebo base to the Gulf of Aden off the coast of Somalia with the escort ship JS Inazuma and returned to Japan on January 12, 2016.

From October 13 to November 25, 2017, she was dispatched to the waters around Hawaii and participated in the US dispatch training.

From August 26 to October 30, 2018, participated in the Indo-Pacific dispatch training with the escort vessels JS Kaga and JS Inazuma, and visited India, Indonesia, Singapore, Sri Lanka and Philippines. On September 13, she joined the submarine JS Kuroshio in the South China Sea and conducted anti-submarine warfare training.

On April 21, 2019, she entered Qingdao to participate in the International Fleet Review Ceremony to be held on April 23 near Qingdao, Shandong Province, to commemorate the 70th anniversary of the PLA Navy. It had been about seven and a half years since the last JMSDF ship visited China in December 2011.

From August 15 to 17, 2020, Japan-US joint training was conducted with the US Navy destroyer USS Mustin in the East China Sea.

Gallery

References

 

2012 ships
Ships built by Mitsubishi Heavy Industries
Akizuki-class destroyers (2010)